Franklin Grove is a village in Lee County, Illinois, United States. The population was 1,021 at the 2010 census, down from 1,052 in 2000.

History
Franklin Grove was named for James R. Franklin, a pioneer who settled in a grove near the town site.

The Lincoln Highway Association (LHA) maintains a national tourist center in Franklin Grove, in a historic building built by Harry Isaac Lincoln, a cousin of Abraham Lincoln.  The LHA is a national organization dedicated to the preservation and promotion of the Lincoln Highway, the first road across the United States of America, which was routed through Franklin Grove.

Geography

Demographics

As of the census of 2000, there were 1,052 people, 372 households, and 249 families residing in the village. The racial makeup of the village was 99.24% White, 0.10% African American, 0.10% Asian, 0.29% from other races, and 0.29% from two or more races. Hispanic or Latino of any race were 0.57% of the population.

There were 372 households, out of which 34.7% had children under the age of 18 living with them, 52.4% were married couples living together, 10.2% had a female householder with no husband present, and 32.8% were non-families. 28.8% of all households were made up of individuals, and 21.0% had someone living alone who was 65 years of age or older. The average household size was 2.51 and the average family size was 3.10.

In the village, the population was spread out, with 24.0% under the age of 18, 8.6% from 18 to 24, 23.3% from 25 to 44, 19.7% from 45 to 64, and 24.4% who were 65 years of age or older. The median age was 41 years. For every 100 females, there were 85.5 males. For every 100 females age 18 and over, there were 76.4 males.

The median income for a household in the village was $41,181, and the median income for a family was $45,875. Males had a median income of $33,654 versus $19,063 for females. The per capita income for the village was $15,427. About 5.9% of families and 7.7% of the population were below the poverty line, including 12.3% of those under age 18 and 6.4% of those age 65 or over.

The Nachusa Grasslands, a prairie restoration operated by the Nature Conservancy, began operating in 1986.

Churches
Franklin Grove has four churches within the city limits:  The Franklin Grove United Methodist Church, Church of the Brethren, First Presbyterian and St. Paul's Lutheran Church.

See also
Banditti of the Prairie

References

External links
Franklin Grove Official Website
Franklin Grove at Lee County Historical Society Website

Villages in Lee County, Illinois
Villages in Illinois